Trade paperback may refer to:
 Trade paperback, a higher-quality softcover version of a book
 Trade paperback (comics), a collection of previously published comic books

Books by type